Redfield is a census-designated place in Nacogdoches County, Texas, United States. This was a new CDP for the 2010 census with a population of 441.

Geography
Redfield is located at  (31.680518, -94.662873).

References

Census-designated places in Nacogdoches County, Texas
Census-designated places in Texas